Blahodatne is a village formerly in Amvrosiivka Raion, now in Donetsk Raion of Donetsk Oblast in eastern Ukraine

Demographics
Native language as of the Ukrainian Census of 2001:
 Ukrainian 93.40%
 Russian 6.49%
 Belarusian 0.03%

References

Villages in Donetsk Raion